"Suddenly" is a song by American R&B singer–songwriter Toni Braxton, released internationally in February 2006 as the lead single from the European edition of her fifth studio album, Libra (2005). Written and produced by Richard Marx, it failed to make the charts anywhere. The track features Chris Botti on the trumpet, and was originally planned to appear on his 2005 album To Love Again: The Duets. Marx recorded this song as a duet with Braxton for his 2008 studio release Sundown and would later release it as a solo track on Now And Forever: The Ballads (2014) and yet as a different version on Beautiful Goodbye (2014).

Track listing
All tracks written and produced by Richard Marx.

Personnel
Credits adapted from liner notes of Libra.

Performers and musicians
Toni Braxton – vocals
Richard Marx – bass, keyboards, piano, backing vocals
Heitor Pereira – acoustic guitar
Bruce Gaitsch – guitar solo
Chris Botti – trumpet

Technical
Richard Marx – producer, arranger, drum programming
David Cole – engineer
Mat Prock – engineer
Chip Matthews – engineer, mixing
Al Schmidt – engineer
Brian Gill – assistant engineer

Charts

References

2005 songs
2006 singles
Richard Marx songs
Songs written by Richard Marx
Toni Braxton songs
Smooth jazz songs